The 2004 OFC Women's Under 19 Qualifying Tournament was the second staging of the OFC Women's U-20 Qualifying Tournament. The tournament was hosted by Papua New Guinea, with matches played between 20 and 24 April 2004.

Australia won their second title after defeating the other two competitors (Papua New Guinea and Solomon Islands) in a round robin.

Venues 
All matches were played at Lloyd Robson Oval in Port Moresby, Papua New Guinea.

Format 
With three teams participating, the tournament was played as a round robin, with each team playing each other once. The top team qualified for the 2004 FIFA U-19 Women's World Championship

Squads 
There was a maximum squad size of 20 players for the tournament.

Referees 
 Michael Afu (Solomon Islands)
 Paul Lynch (Cook Islands)
 Jacqui Melksham (Australia)

Matches 
Teams were awarded three points for a win, one point for a draw and no points for a defeat.

Goalscorers 
5 goals
  Leena Khamis
  Selin Kuralay

4 goals
  Leah Blayney
  Kylie Ledbrook

3 goals
  Jenna Tristram

2 goals
  Renee Cartwright
  Sally Shipard

1 goal
  Katie Hilder
  Alannah Reed
  Neilen Limbai

References

External links 
 Official website

2004 in women's association football
OFC U-19 Women's Championship
International association football competitions hosted by Papua New Guinea
2003–04 in OFC football
2004 in youth association football